"Love Me Like You Used To" is a song written by Paul Davis and Bobby Emmons, and recorded by American country music artist Johnny Cash for his 1985 studio album Rainbow.  The song was later recorded by American country music artist Tanya Tucker in 1987. The song was released in July of that year as the first single and title track from Tucker's album Love Me Like You Used To.  The song reached number two on the Billboard Hot Country Singles chart.

Charts

Weekly charts

Year-end charts

References

1987 singles
Johnny Cash songs
Tanya Tucker songs
Songs written by Paul Davis (singer)
Capitol Records Nashville singles
Song recordings produced by Jerry Crutchfield
1985 songs
Songs written by Bobby Emmons